Oceanisphaera profunda is a Gram-negative and aerobic bacterium from the genus of Oceanisphaera which has been isolated from deep-sea sediments from the South China Sea.

References 

Aeromonadales
Bacteria described in 2014